FC Gornyak Kushva was a Russian football team from Kushva. It played professionally in 1995 and 1996. Their best result was 7th place in Zone 6 of the Russian Third League in 1995.

External links
  Team history at KLISF

Association football clubs established in 1992
Association football clubs disestablished in 1997
Defunct football clubs in Russia
Sport in Sverdlovsk Oblast
1992 establishments in Russia
1997 disestablishments in Russia